Alejandro "Álex" Bermejo Escribano (born 11 December 1998) is a Spanish professional footballer who plays for Burgos CF as a right winger.

Club career
Born in Barcelona, Catalonia, Bermejo finished his formation with RCD Espanyol. He made his senior debut with the reserves on 13 November 2016, starting in a 0–0 Segunda División B away draw against CD Atlético Baleares.

Bermejo scored his first senior goal on 15 January 2017, but in a 1–2 loss at Valencia CF Mestalla. He was regularly used in the following campaigns, suffering relegation in 2017 but achieving promotion in 2018.

On 11 July 2019, Bermejo signed a three-year deal with Segunda División side CD Tenerife. He made his professional debut on 17 August, coming on as a late substitute for Aitor Sanz in a 0–2 away loss against Real Zaragoza.

Bermejo scored his first professional goal on 15 September 2019, netting the opener in a 4–0 away routing of Albacete Balompié. Ten days later, he scored a brace in a 4–1 away success over CD Lugo.

On 21 July 2022, free agent Bermejo signed a one-year contract with Burgos CF also in the second division.

References

External links

1998 births
Living people
Footballers from Barcelona
Spanish footballers
Association football wingers
Segunda División players
Segunda División B players
Tercera División players
RCD Espanyol B footballers
CD Tenerife players
Burgos CF footballers